Cams Wharf is a locality on the Swansea peninsula between Lake Macquarie and the Pacific Ocean in New South Wales, Australia. It is part of the City of Lake Macquarie local government area.

References

External links
 History of Cams Wharf (Lake Macquarie City Library)

Suburbs of Lake Macquarie